Victor Power or Vic Power may refer to:

Victor O'Donovan Power (1860–1933), Irish playwright, novelist and short-story writer
Vic Power (1927–2005), Puerto Rican-born Major League Baseball player
Victor M. Power, Canadian mayor of Timmins between 1980 and 2006